Mavis Le Marquand is a former international lawn bowler from Jersey.

She won a silver medal in the pairs at the 1992 World Outdoor Bowls Championship in Ayr with Sheila Syvret.

She also competed at the 1994 Commonwealth Games.

References

Jersey female bowls players
Bowls players at the 1994 Commonwealth Games
Commonwealth Games competitors for Jersey